The Guadalupe Bridge is a road bridge that connects the cities of Makati and Mandaluyong in Metro Manila, Philippines

Background
The Guadalupe Bridge, which is part of EDSA, consists of an inner bridge and two outer bridges.
The two outer bridges were constructed in 1979 with Umali-Pajara Construction Company as its general contractor. The outer bridges have 10 lanes in total and a junction at the Makati side of the bridge connects to J. P. Rizal Avenue.

A separate but unconnected tied-arch rail bridge of the Manila Metro Rail Transit System Line 3 exists above the road bridge.

According to a December 2013 report by JICA, the Guadalupe Bridge has the highest traffic volume among 12 main bridges in Metro Manila, with 220,000 vehicles crossing the bridge daily.

Planned renovation
By 2016, the bridge has been identified as one of the structures expected to collapse following a hypothetical strong earthquake in Metro Manila. Major repairs were done on the bridge in 2019.

The outer bridges were replaced by three-span steel deck box girders while the inner bridge assessed by JICA to be in good condition was retrofitted. The pedestrian sidewalk was expanded to  while the outer bridges continued to have 10 lanes in total.

References

Bridges in Metro Manila
Buildings and structures in Makati
Buildings and structures in Mandaluyong
Buildings and structures completed in 1979
Road-rail bridges
20th-century architecture in the Philippines